Belorussky railway station also referred to as Moscow–Passenger–Smolenskaya, Informally the whole station can be called as Moscow Belorusskaya, is a railway terminal of the Moscow Railway located at the front of Tverskaya Zastava Square in Central Administrative Okrug, Moscow. The station is one of nine railway terminals of Moscow. It was opened in 1870 and rebuilt in its current form in 1907–1912.

Operations 

Belorussky railway station serves long distance trains to regions west and south-west of Moscow, and one train each to the north-east (on the Savyolovsky branch to Rybinsk with continuing service to Uglich, Vesegonsk, and Pestovo) and to the south (to Anapa through Tula, Kursk, Voronezh, and Rostov-on-Don). The station also serves local commuter trains (Belorussky suburban railway line and Line D1 of Moscow Central Diameters) to Usovo, Odintsovo, Golitsyno, Kubinka I, Mozhaisk (including express service), Borodino, and Zvenigorod as well as the Aeroexpress service to Sheremetyevo Airport.

The station is not entirely a terminus station. In addition, the station provides through service to Savyolovsky (Savyolovsky suburban railway line and Line D1 of Moscow Central Diameters) and Kursky stations. Until 18 May 2015 a suburban train service also continued to Gagarin, and until the end of 2012 to Vyazma. Now the farthest station of commuter train service on this line is Mozhaisk. Approximately 1500 passengers per hour use Belorussky station.

Belorussky railway station is included in the Moscow Regional Directorate of the Directorate of railway stations. This station is part of the Moscow–Smolensk unit of DTSS-3, Moscow Directorate of Rail Traffic Control.

History 

Construction of the railway from Moscow to Smolensk, and then to Minsk and Warsaw, started in the second half of the 1860s. Construction of the station, known as Smolensky, began in late April 1869. A grand opening of the Moscow–Smolensk railway took place on 19 September 1870, the station became the sixth in Moscow. In November 1871 after the extension of the railway to Belarus, the station was renamed Belorussky Station. On 15 May 1910, the right wing of the new station opened, and on 26 February 1912, the left wing opened. The station was designed by architect . On 4 May 1912, the railway was renamed the Alexander Railway, the station was renamed Alexander Station. In August 1922, Alexander and the Moscow-Baltic railways were merged into the Moscow-Belarus-Baltic, so the station was renamed Belorussian-Baltic station. In May 1936, after yet another reorganization of the railways, the station received its present name – Belorussky Station.

Aeroexpress 

In September 2007 OAO "Aeroexpress" began the reconstruction of the rail link to Sheremetyevo Airport. The cost of reconstruction at the Belorussky station was estimated at US$7.7 million and involved the construction of a new terminal, which has become one of the main links in rail traffic between Moscow and the airport. The new Belorussky terminal is located in the fourth hall of the railway station and occupies an area of  Passengers departing from Sheremetyevo can check in for flights using the self-service kiosks. The terminal was opened on 27 August 2009.

In June 2008 construction of a new railway terminal complex at Sheremetyevo was completed. New purpose-built rolling stock, the electric ED4MKM-Aero developed by ZAO "Transmashholding" serves the line.

Baggage check-in at the city terminal was abolished on 1 December 2010 in connection with the sharp increase in the number of passengers. The one-way cost of the trip is 500 rubles (1000 rubles for business class).

Trains and destinations

Long distance

Other destinations

Suburban destinations 
Suburban commuter trains (elektrichka) connect Belorussky station with the towns of Barvikha, Usovo, Odintsovo, Golitsyno, Zvenigorod, Kubinka, Mozhaysk.

Some suburban commuter trains (elektrichka) also proceed to Savyolovsky Rail Terminal to the Savyolovo direction destinations (Dolgoprudny, Lobnya, Nekrasovsky, Iksha, Dmitrov, Taldom, Dubna) and to Kursky Rail Terminal to Kursk direction destinations (Shcherbinka, Podolsk, Serpukhov).

Airport connections 
Belorussky station is connected to Savyolovsky Rail Terminal (before 30 May 2010) and Sheremetyevo International Airport by Aeroexpress trains.

Cultural references 
 A film "Belorussky station" was created in 1970 by Andrei Smirnov.

References

External links 

 Official Belorussky station website 
 Российские Железные Дороги — Russian Railways 
 Aeroexpress 
 Беларуская Чыгунка — Belarusian Railways 
 Lietuvos Geležinkeliai — Lithuanian Railways 
 Polskie Koleje Państwowe SA — Polish State Railways 
 České dráhy — Czech Railways 

Railway stations in Moscow
Railway stations of Moscow Railway
Railway stations in the Russian Empire opened in 1870
Tverskoy District
Cultural heritage monuments of regional significance in Moscow
Neoclassical architecture in Russia
Line D1 (Moscow Central Diameters) stations